The Jennings-Salter House, also known as the Michael Salter House, is a historic house located in Lancaster, Kentucky. The house was placed on the United States National Register of Historic Places in 1980.

It was built during 1821 to 1826. It is a one-story, five bay, Federal-style structure built of brick laid in Flemish bond.

At some point, it came to house the Garrard County Historical Society.

References

External links
 Garrard County Historical Society

National Register of Historic Places in Garrard County, Kentucky
Federal architecture in Kentucky
Houses in Garrard County, Kentucky
Houses on the National Register of Historic Places in Kentucky
Lancaster, Kentucky
1821 establishments in Kentucky
Houses completed in 1821